Eagle Spring is a physical feature - a spring for running water - located within Sandoval County, New Mexico and is located in the New Mexico Zip Code delivery area of 87013.

In 1854–1855, Eagle Spring, Territory of New Mexico was the site of an engagement between a small unit of the U.S. Army and some local natives. It was at this engagement that the U.S. Army's Frank Crawford Armstrong fought bravely enough to earn himself a Commissioned Officer appointment in the U.S. Army as a Lieutenant.

Sandoval County, New Mexico